This is a partial list of Hungarian sportspeople. For the full plain list of Hungarian sportspeople on Wikipedia, see :Category:Hungarian sportspeople.

Athletics

Rudolf Bauer
Ibolya Csák
József Csermák
Nándor Dáni
Lajos Gönczy
Olga Gyarmati
Gyula Kellner
Antal Kiss
Balázs Kiss
Jolán Kleiber-Kontsek
József Kovács
Zoltán Kővágó
Gergely Kulcsár
Anita Márton
Angéla Németh
Imre Németh
Miklós Németh
Krisztián Pars
Sándor Rozsnyói
Márta Rudas
Elemér Somfay
István Somodi
Béla Szepes
Alajos Szokolyi
Annamária Tóth
Gyula Zsivótzky

Boxing
Zoltán Béres
István Kovács
György Mizsei
László Papp

Canoeing

Attila Ábrahám
Attila Adrovicz
Ferenc Csipes
Kinga Czigány
Rudolf Dombi
Éva Dónusz
Natasa Dusev-Janics
Krisztina Fazekas Zur
László Fidel
Zsolt Gyulay
Csaba Horváth
Gábor Horváth
Zoltán Kammerer
Rita Kőbán
Roland Kökény
György Kolonics
Katalin Kovács
Danuta Kozák
Tamás Kulifai
Erika Mészáros
Dániel Pauman
Imre Pulai
András Rajna
Botond Storcz
Gabriella Szabó
Dávid Tóth
György Zala

Equestrian
József von Platthy

Fencing

Péter Abay
  Peter Bakonyi (1933–1997) 
Imre Bujdosó
Dezső Földes
Jenő Fuchs
Oszkár Gerde
Ferenc Hegedűs
Géza Imre
Ernő Kolczonay
Iván Kovács
Csaba Köves
Krisztián Kulcsár
Tímea Nagy
József Navarrete
György Nébald
Bence Szabó
Gyöngyi Szalay-Horváth
Áron Szilágyi
Péter Tóth
Gábor Totola
Ildikó Újlaky-Rejtő
Lajos Werkner

Figure skating
Andrea Kékesy
Ede Király
László Nagy
Marianna Nagy
Krisztina Regőczy
Emília Rotter
András Sallay
László Szollás

Football 

 Tibor Bábik
 Gyula Bádonyi
 Endre Bajúsz
 Tibor Baranyai
 József Braun 
 Gábor Brlázs
 József Bujáki
 László Cseke
 Richárd Csepregi
 Domenico D'Alberto
 Attila Dorogi
 Tamás Filó
 Emil Gabrovitz
 Tamás Györök
 Ladislav Izsák
 Tibor Kalina
Adolf Kertész (1892–1920)
 Gyula Kertész (1888–1982)
Vilmos Kertész (1890–1962)
 Ádám Kisznyér
 Szilárd Kovács
 Tamás Lapsánszki
 Péter Lelkes
 Dániel Lettrich
 László Megyesi
 Kálmán Menyhárt
 Ferenc Szilveszter
 Imre Taussig
 József Ursz
Antal Vágó 
 Viktor Valentényi

Gymnastics
Krisztián Berki
Szilveszter Csollány
Anikó Ducza-Jánosi
Márta Egervári
Vid Hidvégi
Ágnes Keleti
Margit Korondi
Olga Lemhényi-Tass
Katalin Makray
Henrietta Ónodi
Ferenc Pataki
István Pelle

Judo
József Csák
Éva Csernoviczki
Imre Csösz
Bertalan Hajtós
Tibor Kincses
Antal Kovács
András Ozsvár
József Tuncsik
Miklós Ungvári

Modern pentathlon
Ádám Marosi
János Martinek
Attila Mizsér

Rowing
József Csermely
Károly Levitzky
Antal Melis
Zoltán Melis
György Sarlós
Antal Szendey
Róbert Zimonyi
Béla Zsitnik

Sailing
Szabolcs Detre
Zsolt Detre

Swimming

Péter Bernek
Attila Czene
László Cseh
Ferenc Csik
Tamás Darnyi
Krisztina Egerszegi
Márta Egerváry
Károly Güttler
Andrea Gyarmati
Dániel Gyurta
Gergely Gyurta
Alfréd Hajós
Zoltán Halmay
Katinka Hosszú
Zsuzsanna Jakabos
Géza Kiss
Ágnes Kovács
Éva Risztov
Norbert Rózsa
Tünde Szabó
Éva Székely
Evelyn Verrasztó

Tennis
József Asbóth
Tímea Babos
Zsuzsa Körmöczy
Ágnes Szávay
Balázs Taróczy
Andrea Temesvári

Wrestling
Péter Farkas
Gábor Hatos
Garry Kallos 
Tamás Lőrincz
Péter Módos
Attila Repka
Richárd Weisz

See also
Sport in Hungary
Hungary at the Olympics
Hungary at the Paralympics

Hungary
 
Sports